The Ford Territory is a mid-size crossover SUV built by Ford Australia that was introduced in April 2004 and produced until October 2016. It was not only the only SUV that was built in Australia, but also Ford's first large three-row crossover SUV. It was based on the EA169 platform introduced by the EA Falcon, and its internal project codename was E265. Winner of various automotive awards since its introduction, the Territory was the first SUV to win the coveted Australian title of Wheels Car of the Year in 2004, courtesy of acceptable handling and child carrying capacity.

Ford Australia reportedly spent A$500 million on developing this vehicle over a four-year period. Many Australian toolmakers were lauded for their cost competitiveness in keeping this cost so low, not as cheap as the Japanese, but much lower than Detroit-based cars. Apart from being the first and only Australian-made SUV, it was also the first local vehicle to feature electronic stability control.

Production of the Territory ended on 7 October 2016.

Design
Both rear-wheel drive (RWD) and all-wheel drive (AWD) configurations were available for the Australian market. AWD models had an optional anti-lock braking system to control the car's motion downhill.

Reflecting its SUV design, seating capacity in the Territory was for either five (two rows) or seven (three rows) passengers, making it excellent for large families with children. All seating rows were arranged in a "theatre style", whereby the first row was the lowest and the last row was the highest. The middle and back rows folded flat into the floor to maximise cargo volume.

Ford introduced the Territory alongside the existing Falcon wagon, which was built on the same Broadmeadows Assembly Plant production line. Ford Australia senior executives had expected the Falcon wagon to be discontinued soon after the introduction of the Territory, surmising that Falcon wagon sales would substantially decline as fleet buyers migrated to the Territory. However, this did not happen because the Falcon wagon retained much of its fleet sales base and the Territory appealed mainly to large families.  The production of the Falcon station wagon was terminated in September 2010. The 
Territory was never a serious replacement for it due to higher fuel consumption and increased weight.

Ford R7 concept 

The Ford R7 was a concept SUV which was developed by Ford Australia under the auspices of the late Geoff Polites and was revealed at the 2002 Australian International Motor Show held in Melbourne. So great was the reception of the R7, that Ford fast tracked the development of the R7 into a full blown production model just two years later as the Ford Territory and it previewed the new front styling of the donor Ford Falcon (BA) range.

Model range 

Between 2004 and 2016, the Territory had been manufactured adopting the same chassis and sold in a total of five series (SX, SY, SYII, SZ, and final SZ II). The launch of the FG series Falcon, however, resulted in the Territory undergoing a major redesign inside and out, and unlike the donor sedan, receiving a turbodiesel powerplant, citing high fuel consumption of the 6 cylinder engines due to the high curb weight.

SX:

The first series, known as the "SX", was produced between April 2004 and September 2005.

Appearance-wise, the Territory adopted styling cues from the North American Freestyle/Taurus X, which proved to be a defining factor for the support of Ford executives at the head office in Dearborn, Michigan. Simon Butterworth, who was behind the major restyling of the Falcon that resulted in the 2002 BA series, styled the Territory. Marcus Hotblack worked on the Territory's interior, inspired by a knife. As a result, the Territory had such convenient features as flexing cup holders and a handbag holder to the side of the seat for female drivers.

The SX Territory was the first Australian-built vehicle to be fitted with an electronic stability control system. In addition, Territory was the first SUV to have won the Australian Wheels Car of the Year award, in 2004.

Model range
At launch, the SX range of models (and Australian retail prices) were:
 TX: base package;
 TS: family safety package;
 Ghia: luxury package;.

An Alpine DVD entertainment system for rear passengers, with 10.2-inch screen and infrared headphones, was offered as standard or optional depending on the model variant.

Australian and New Zealand SX series models were slightly different visually: all models sold in New Zealand had body-colour bumpers and alloy wheels, including the base model. Front light detail resembles that of women's jewellery in a black box. In New Zealand, the only RWD model was the base version and all other models had AWD; while in Australia, all models were available with both traction setups.

The colour range included: Indiana, Envi, Mandarine, Offshore, Silhouette, Winter White and Zesty.

SY:

The SY, primarily a mechanical upgrade with no significant visual differentiation, was introduced in October 2005. Its key features included increased engine power 190 kW, new automatic transmission for AWD models, and as a first for an Australian-built vehicle, a reverse parking camera (optional on the TS and standard on Ghia). The TS now featured standard reverse sensors. All models received a new key design, and on cars built after May 2006, the plastic rear cladding along the bottom edge of the rear tailgate changed to be pressed into the sheet metal.

The previous DSI four-speed automatic transmission was retained with minor updates for RWD models; AWD models now featured the six-speed ZF 6HP26 automatic transmission that contributed to slightly improved fuel consumption.

Being AWD, it was only available with the then-new six-speed ZF automatic transmission.

Model range
The range remained unchanged except for the introduction, in mid-2006, of a Territory Turbo available in standard trim or luxury Ghia. It was powered by a turbocharged 4.0-litre DOHC straight-six version of the Barra engine that, due to costs considerations and the Australian market preference for performance variants, took priority over the introduction of a mooted diesel variant to curtail the high 6 cylinder fuel consumption.

At launch, the original SY range of models (and Australian retail prices) were:
 TX;
 TS;
 Ghia.

The first Territory TX-based limited editions emerged:
 SR – released in February 2006, and re-released in June 2008
 SR2 – released in October 2008

The initial colour range was: Winter White, Wired, Lightning Strike, Silhouette, Mercury Silver, Kashmir, Dejavu, Icon and Indiana. It subsequently included: Steel, Grace, Flare, Conquer, Silk, Ego, Seduce, Neo, Velvet and Sensations.

FPV F6X:

On 29 February 2008, Ford Performance Vehicles (FPV) launched the "F6X", which was the first and only non-Falcon vehicle sold by this Ford subsidiary.

Effectively a high-performance version of the Territory Turbo, it was only available in AWD and with a six-speed automatic transmission. This resulted in this SUV being the most powerful SUV available at the time, with a fast  acceleration time of 5.9 seconds.

FPV foreshadowed its intention to enter the SUV scene with the "P-SUV" concept car displayed at its Open Day in February 2007. This vehicle featured a pick-up body style and aggressive off-road styling. The final F6X concept was otherwise displayed at the October 2007 Australian International Motor Show in Sydney.

Aside from its high-performance engine, its other key features included 18-inch wheels, upgraded front Brembo brakes, and fittings such as seating (optional third row seat) and instrumentation styled to mirror those of the FPV sedans. As a consequence, production ceased in February 2009 and it was no longer available with the SY II series launched in June 2009.

The F6X colour range included: Ego, Winter White, Lightning Strike, Nitro, Seduce, Sensations, Silhouette and Velvet. Depending on the exterior paint chosen, each had the option of one of two stripe packages in metallic Azure Blue, Pewter or Silver and matte Black. It also featured datadot paint technology.

SY II:

The SY II series was a facelift revealed at the 2009 Australian International Motor Show held in Melbourne and went on sale that May. It featured a mildly restyled front end and other minor exterior changes, improved interior trim (with the previous upholstery colour schemes replaced by more contemporary ones) and improved suspension design. Powertrains remained unchanged, except for the axing of the  "FPV F6X". The BA/BF Falcon centre console and Interior Command Control (ICC) was again reused for the SY II despite the newer FG Falcon having a completely redesigned console and ICC.

The SY II received a revised front suspension to address a well-documented weakness in the front lower ball joints. With the new design, the lower ball joints were now under compression, thus eliminating the premature wear issue.

Model range
The SY II Territory range and upgrades (plus Australian retail prices at launch) were:
 TX: with body-coloured bumpers and alloy wheels standard;
 TS: body-coloured bumpers, new alloy wheels, seven-seater with third-row standard.
 Ghia: external mirrors mounted side indicators, new alloy wheels, privacy glass for the rear passenger and cargo windows.

The Turbo was now available only in the latter luxury specification (for ).

A TS Limited Edition was marketed in December 2009 and October 2010 to stimulate sales by providing Ghia-derived fittings.

At launch, the colour range included: Silhouette, Lightning Strike, Velvet, Harmony, Sensations, Steel, Ego, Seduce, Mystic, Winter White and Kashmir.

Through the addition of a front passenger seatbelt warning chime implemented on cars produced from 11 January 2010, the entire Territory range qualified for a full five-star Australasian New Car Assessment Program crash test score. Models produced prior to this date only had a four-star rating.

SZ (major redesign):

The SZ series Territory was released in April 2011. Ford Australia released official photos of this facelifted edition on 8 February 2011.

In line with Ford's internationally adopted Kinetic Design, the car features a large lower air intake and thin upper grille. It has an estimated . Titanium models feature LED "position" lights, in lieu of the fog lights fitted on the mid-spec TS. At the rear, the car features horizontal tail lights, replacing the vertical lights on previous editions. On the inside, courtesy of the FG Falcon upgrades, the higher-range Territory models also inherited an eight-inch colour touch screen, which is central to the "SYNC" in-car entertainment and control system. New safety features include a driver's knee airbag and updated stability control system, now version 9.0 by Bosch incorporating an anti-roll-over function.

Mechanically, the SZ series introduced for the first time in Ford Australia's locally made vehicles, a diesel powerplant (whose cost and development in previous editions was postponed in favour of the turbo petrol variant of 2006). It also introduced an electric power-assist steering system used on the American Ford Mustang, which was also poised for introduction on the Falcon.

The engines range of the SZ series comprised the usual but further upgraded 4.0-litre DOHC straight-six petrol engine only for the RWD Territory, and a turbocharged, direct injection 2.7-litre 60-degree V6 diesel engine marketed as "Durpatorq" for the RWD and AWD Territory models. Petrol-engined AWD models are no longer offered. At launch, the diesel engine was a seven-year-old Ford AJD-V6/PSA DT17 engine, which debuted in Australia with the Jaguar XF and Land Rover Discovery 3. It reportedly emits up to 25% less  compared to the petrol engine.

Across the range, two types of six-speed automatic transmission became default depending on model variants. For petrol-engined RWD—the ZF 6HP26 transmission; for diesel-engined RWD and AWD the ZF-based, 6R80 transmission produced by Ford in the United States is used.

Interior-wise, finally the new Territory gained the centre console and ICC of the FG Falcon. Up until this time the Territory had continued to reused the 2002-2008 BA/BF Falcon interior and ICC.

Model range
The range remained the same except for the Titanium replacing the Ghia, reflecting a similar changes made to the related Ford Falcon (FG) range.

The SZ range and key features or upgrades (plus Australian retail prices at launch) were as follows:
 TX: 17-inch alloy wheels, iPod/USB integration, Bluetooth phone connectivity and cruise control). Available in RWD petrol, RWD diesel, AWD diesel;
 TS: as above but with 18-inch alloy wheels plus four-way power adjustable driver seat, 8-inch colour touch screen, front fog lights, dual-zone climate control, premium audio system and reversing camera, standard 7-seat capacity. Available in RWD petrol, RWD diesel, AWD diesel;
 Titanium: as above plus different 18-inch alloy wheels, LED "position" lights, external mirrors mounted side indicators, chrome detachable front grille, 6-way power adjustable driver seat with three memory settings, glass for the rear passenger and cargo windows, auto-dimming rear-view mirror, satellite navigation with Traffic Message Channel, Alpine DVD entertainment system for rear passengers with 10.2-inch screen and infrared headphones, leather seat trim (in "Shadow" black or "Cashmere" beige). Available in RWD petrol, RWD diesel, AWD diesel.

The Titanium model has proven to be the most popular variant and the SZ series led Ford Australia to reach a significant manufacturing milestone by building 150,000th Territory (a white TX TCDi RWD model) in 2012.

The Titanium (in AWD 2.7-Litre TCDi specification) was also the only variant for exports to Thailand that resumed in late 2012.

A TX Limited Edition was marketed in August 2012 to stimulate sales by providing TS-derived fittings.

The colour range included: Havana, Vanish, Lightning Strike, White, Edge, Chill, Smoke, Seduce and Silhouette.

SZ II:

After 10 years of production, the SZ II series represented the Territory before Ford Australia's full production (which also included the FG X Falcon sedan) ceased in October 2016.

The SZ II began production alongside the FG X Falcon on 20 October 2014 and went on sale in the Australian market in December 2014. Its model range remains unchanged relative to the SZ series but, externally, it features subtle styling revisions consisting of a new fascia and alloy wheels, with the Territory losing out its LED "position lights" in favour of more traditional foglights. Mechanically, the engine range also remains unchanged apart from transmission tweaks and aerodynamic improvements that deliver around 0.5% better fuel consumption. Inside, new trims colours feature along with an updated "SYNC2" touchscreen in-car entertainment and control system with voice command, Wi-Fi connectivity, DAB+ radio, and emergency call functionality.

Exports

New Zealand
The Territory was sold in New Zealand, with 12,000 units sold there.

South Africa
Exports to South Africa were made in 2005. Sales of the Territory were unveiled on June 22, 2005. The TX and Ghia AWD/RWD models were sold there. Prior to its debut, a Territory was sent to South Africa in 2004 for assessment by Ford's South African branch.

Around 2,300 Territorys were exported.

Thailand
Exports of the Territory to Thailand was announced to go on sale in April 2006 with the Ghia 4WD model. Prior to that, the SY Territory appeared at the 2005 Bangkok Motor Show. A Thailand-Australia Free Trade Agreement was also in place at the time the exports started after 2005.

Around 100 Territorys were sold to Thailand in August 2012 after Ford Australia showed interest in a diesel-powered version at the 2012 Bangkok Motor Show held in March 2012.

Concerns were raised that the Thai export program Ford Australia participated in could collapse due to high taxes imposed on imported vehicles. This was pointed out in 2013 after taxes were raised that it was expensive to purchase a Territory.

Sales

Chinese-market Territory 

The Territory nameplate is also used on a compact crossover SUV for the Chinese market. Introduced in 2016, the Chinese-market Territory was developed by the JMC-Ford joint venture. The model was developed based on the JMC-developed Yusheng S330. As of 2020, the Chinese-market Ford Territory was also sold in Brazil, Argentina, the Philippines, Cambodia, Laos, Peru, Ecuador, Bolivia, Chile and Vietnam.

Available safety features

The Ford territory had safety features such as driver or passenger airbag, ABS and seat belt.

References

External links 
 
 Ford press release published at Autoweb
 FPV website

Territory
All-wheel-drive vehicles
Cars introduced in 2004
Cars of Australia
Crossover sport utility vehicles
Rear-wheel-drive vehicles
2010s cars